Pinacosterna is a genus of longhorn beetles of the subfamily Lamiinae, containing the following species:

 Pinacosterna marginalis Breuning, 1935
 Pinacosterna mechowi Quedenfeldt, 1882 
 Pinacosterna mimica Jordan, 1903
 Pinacosterna nachtigali Harold, 1879
 Pinacosterna weymanni Quedenfeldt, 1882

References

Cerambycidae genera
Sternotomini